The Pleasant Plains station is an elevated Staten Island Railway station in the neighborhood of Pleasant Plains, Staten Island, New York.

History 
The station opened on June 2, 1860, with the opening of the Staten Island Railway from Annadale to Tottenville.

In 1913, the station received several improvements. Electric lights were installed in the signals, platform, and station, a new concrete lack was installed on the station approach, metal sheet was installed to cover the waiting room and ticket office, and the station received a fresh coat of paint.

Station layout
Located at Penton Street and Amboy Road, the station has two side platforms and orange canopies. Parts of the old northbound platforms are visible and can be viewed from either side at the north end of this station; wooden boards and concrete are evidence of this.

Exit

Mount Loretto Spur 
South of the station is another set of crossovers and the right-of-way of the Mount Loretto Spur that formerly served the Mount Loretto orphanage. The B&O served the Mt. Loretto non-electrified branch until 1950, which had some industry and a passenger station. The Mt. Loretto branch track was removed in the 1960s and 1970s but some ties were visible until the 1980s. A coal dump trestle is all that remains, located behind the powerhouse.

References

External links

Staten Island Railway station list
Staten Island Railway general information
 Amboy Road entrance from Google Maps Street View
 Platform level from Google Maps Street View

Staten Island Railway stations
Railway stations in the United States opened in 1860